The European bee-eater (Merops apiaster) is a near passerine bird in the bee-eater family, Meropidae. It breeds in southern and central Europe, northern and southern Africa, and western Asia. Except for the resident southern African population, the species is strongly migratory, wintering in tropical Africa. This species occurs as a spring overshoot north of its usual range, with occasional breeding in northern Europe.

Taxonomy and systematics
The European bee-eater was formally described by the Swedish naturalist Carl Linnaeus in 1758 in the tenth edition of his Systema Naturae under its current binomial name Merops apiaster.  The genus name Merops is Ancient Greek for "bee-eater", and apiaster is Latin, also meaning "bee-eater", from apis, "bee".

Description 
This species, like other bee-eaters, is a richly coloured, slender bird. It has brown and yellow upper parts, whilst the wings are green and the beak is black. Sexes are alike. Female tends to have greener rather than gold feathers on shoulders. Non-breeding plumage is much duller and with a blue-green back and no elongated central tail feathers. Juvenile resembles a non-breeding adult, but with less variation in the feather colours. Adults begin to moult in June or July and complete the process by August or September. There is a further moult into breeding plumage in winter in Africa.

Behaviour and ecology

Breeding

These bee-eaters are gregarious—nesting colonially in sandy banks, preferably near river shores, usually at the beginning of May. They make a relatively long tunnel, in which they lay five to eight spherical white eggs around the beginning of June. Both male and female care for the eggs, which they brood for about three weeks. They also feed and roost communally.

During courtship, the male feeds large items to the female while eating the small ones himself. Most males are monogamous, but occasional bigamy has been encountered. Their typical call is a distinctive, mellow, liquid and burry prreee or prruup.

Feeding 
This bird breeds in open country in warmer climates. As the name suggests, bee-eaters predominantly eat insects, especially bees, wasps, and  hornets. They catch insects in flight, in sorties from an open perch. Before eating a bee, the European bee-eater removes the sting by repeatedly hitting the insect on a hard surface. It can eat around 250 bees a day.

The most important prey item in their diet is Hymenoptera, mostly the European honey bee. A study in Spain found that these comprise 69.4% to 82% of the European bee-eaters' diet. Their impact on bee populations, however, is small. They eat less than 1% of the worker bees in areas where they live.

A study found that European bee-eaters "convert food to body weight more efficiently if they are fed a mixture of bees and dragonflies than if they eat only bees or only dragonflies."

Predation of honey bees 

If an apiary is set up close to a bee-eater colony, a larger number of honey bees are eaten because they are more abundant. Observations show that the birds actually enter the apiary only in cold and rainy periods, when the bees do not leave the hive and other insect prey are harder for the bee-eaters to detect.

Many bee-keepers believe that the bee-eaters are the main obstacle causing worker bees not to forage, and instead stay inside the hives for much of the day between May and the end of August. The foraging rate was higher in presence of the birds than in their absence in some cases. The average bird meal consisted of 90.8% honey bees and 9.2% beetles.

Predation is more likely when the bees are queening or during peak migrations, from late March till mid-April, and in mid-September. Hives close to or under trees or overhead cables are also at increased risk as the birds pounce on flying insects from these perches.

Gallery

See also 
 Bee-eaters in Britain

References

External links 

 European bee-eater videos, photos & sounds on the Internet Bird Collection
 European bee-eater species text in The Atlas of Southern African Birds.
 
 Guêpier d'Europe Merops apiaster - European Bee-eater—Photos at Oiseaux.net
 Feathers of European bee-eater (Merops apiaster) 
 Ageing and sexing by Javier Blasco-Zumeta & Gerd-Michael Heinze  (PDF; 5.4 MB)

European bee-eater
Articles containing video clips
European bee-eater
Birds of Africa
Birds of Eurasia
Birds of Southern Africa
European bee-eater